The trademark symbol  is a symbol to indicate that the preceding mark is a trademark, specifically an unregistered trademark. It complements the registered trademark symbol  which is reserved for trademarks registered with an appropriate government agency.

In Canada, an equivalent  symbol,  (U+1F16A) is used in Quebec. Canada also has an Official mark symbol, to indicate that a name or design used by Canadian public authorities is protected. Some German publications, especially dictionaries, also use a  grapheme,  (U+1F12E), which is informative and independent of the actual protection status of the name.

Use 

Use of the trademark symbol indicates an assertion that a word, image, or other sign is a trademark; it does not indicate registration or impart enhanced protections. Registered trademarks are indicated using the registered trademark symbol, and in some jurisdictions it is unlawful or illegal to use the registered trademark symbol with a mark that has not been registered.

The service mark symbol, is used to indicate the assertion of a service mark (a trademark for the provision of services). The service mark symbol is less commonly used than the trademark sign, especially outside the United States.

Keyboard entry

 Windows:  (on the numeric keypad)
 US international keyboard setting: 
 Linux (and similar): 
 ChromeOS (and Linux): 
 UK Extended keyboard: . (AltGr and *)
 HTML:  or   
 LaTeX:

See also

 Trademark law
 Australian trademark law
 Canadian trademark law
China trademark law
 United Kingdom trademark law
 United States trademark law
 Indian trademark law

References 

United States trademark law
Punctuation
Typographical symbols